Ingrit Lorena Valencia Victoria (born 3 September 1988) is a Colombian female boxer.

She represented Colombia at the 2016 Summer Olympics in Rio de Janeiro, in the women's flyweight, and won the bronze medal. She was the flag bearer for Colombia during the closing ceremony.

She competed at the 2020 Summer Olympics.

References

External links

1988 births
Living people
Colombian women boxers
Olympic boxers of Colombia
Olympic bronze medalists for Colombia
Olympic medalists in boxing
Boxers at the 2016 Summer Olympics
Boxers at the 2020 Summer Olympics
Medalists at the 2016 Summer Olympics
Pan American Games gold medalists for Colombia
Pan American Games silver medalists for Colombia
Pan American Games bronze medalists for Colombia
Pan American Games medalists in boxing
Boxers at the 2011 Pan American Games
Boxers at the 2015 Pan American Games
Boxers at the 2019 Pan American Games
South American Games bronze medalists for Colombia
South American Games gold medalists for Colombia
South American Games medalists in boxing
Competitors at the 2010 South American Games
Competitors at the 2018 South American Games
Central American and Caribbean Games gold medalists for Colombia
Competitors at the 2014 Central American and Caribbean Games
Competitors at the 2018 Central American and Caribbean Games
Flyweight boxers
Central American and Caribbean Games medalists in boxing
Medalists at the 2011 Pan American Games
Medalists at the 2015 Pan American Games
Medalists at the 2019 Pan American Games
AIBA Women's World Boxing Championships medalists
20th-century Colombian women
21st-century Colombian women